Ashlar Hall is a historic mock castle in Memphis, Tennessee, USA.

History
The two-story mansion was completed in 1896. It was designed as a mock castle. The mansion was built for Robert Brinkley Snowden, a real estate developer who grew up at Annesdale.

The mansion was used as a restaurant by the 1950s.

It was listed on the National Register of Historic Places on January 13, 1983.

See also
 National Register of Historic Places listings in Shelby County, Tennessee

References

Houses on the National Register of Historic Places in Tennessee
Houses completed in 1896
Houses in Memphis, Tennessee
Mock castles
National Register of Historic Places in Memphis, Tennessee